Værløse BBK, better known as Værløse Blue Hakws, is a Danish basketball club based in Værløse. The team plays in the Basketligaen, which it joined in the 2018–19 season.

The team also played in the Basketligaen from 2010 until 2015, for five seasons.

Honours
Danish First Division
Champions (1): 2017–18

Season by season

References

Basketball teams established in 1972
Basketball teams in Denmark